Bruguiera sexangula, commonly called the upriver orange mangrove, is a mangrove shrub or tree usually growing up to 15 m, occasionally 30 m, in height.

Description
Bruguiera sexangula may grow as a single-stemmed tree or multi-stemmed shrub.  It has short buttresses at the base of the trunk, and knee-like air-breathing roots, or pneumatophores.  The bark is a smooth grey-brown colour.  The smooth, glossy green leaves are simple and opposite, elliptic to elliptic-oblong, 9.5–20 cm long, 3–7 cm wide, with a pointed apex and a 6 cm petiole, occurring in clusters at the end of the branches.

The flowers have a pale yellow-green to pinkish-orange calyx with 12–14 lobes, 20–24 stamens and 10–12 creamy-orange, bi-lobed petals. The green, cigar-shaped viviparous propagule grows from within the calyx and is 5–12 cm long and 1–2 cm wide.

Distribution and habitat
This mangrove is distributed eastwards along the tropical coasts of Southeast Asia from India to northern Australia and New Caledonia.  It is found on various substrates usually in the upper reaches of river-mouth estuaries with high rainfall and significant freshwater inflow.

Ecology
The large flowers of the mangrove are bird-pollinated. The petals are under tension and hold loose pollen; when the flower is probed, the pollen is released explosively over the head of the visiting bird.

Uses
The mangrove has various traditional uses in Asia.  The developing embryos and the fruits are cooked and eaten after soaking. Juice from the fruits is used to treat sore eyes, shingles and burns.  The timber is heavy, hard and strong and is used as poles as well as for firewood and charcoal.

References

Notes

Sources
 
 

sexangula
Mangroves
Flora of Christmas Island
Flora of the Northern Territory
Flora of Queensland
Flora of New Caledonia
Flora of tropical Asia